Oman Rail is a railway company responsible for rail transport in Oman. It is owned and operated by the Omani Ministry of Transport. The company is based in Al Qurum, Muscat.

History
The company was founded in June 2014. Oman Rail will be responsible for developing the rail network in the country. Currently Oman Rail intends to link Buraimi on the UAE border with Sohar, as part of the proposed Gulf Railway. The proposed line will be a 303 km, double-track, standard-gauge line with 32.4 tonne axle loads and a loading gauge sufficient to accommodate double-stack container trains. Diesel locomotives will run on the line initially, but the plans will provide an option for future electrification.

The next phase of Oman's railway project will be built in two stages. First, an  section will connect the previous line from Hafeet to Ibri. This will be then be extended by 126 km from Ibri to the new economic zone that is proposed to be built. Future plans include extending the network beyond Al Dhahirah, traversing vast expanses of desert in central Oman via Ghabah to Haima, with a southward branch to Al Duqm (and later to Mazyounah on the Yemeni border), and with another branch to Salalah. The final phase of the rail network envisions a south-north line Amal via Al Duqm to Muscat and Sohar.

Passenger trains will operate on the network at speeds of 220 km/h, while freight trains will be limited to a speed of 120 km/h.

Nabil Al Bimani, Group Chief, Ports and Free Zones at Asyad Groups, stated that the first railway line in Oman would be a cargo line connecting Mangi Al-Shuwaimeh and Al-Duqm linking metal production fields with manufacturers and export sites.

References

External links

 Official website

2014 establishments in Oman
Railway companies established in 2014
Companies based in Muscat, Oman
Rail transport in Oman
Railway infrastructure companies